Clement Storer (September 20, 1760November 21, 1830) was a United States representative and Senator from New Hampshire. Born in Kennebunk in Massachusetts Bay's Province of Maine, he completed preparatory studies, studied medicine in Portsmouth, New Hampshire and in Europe, engaged in the practice of medicine in Portsmouth, and was captain of militia and held successive ranks to that of major general.

Storer was a member of the New Hampshire House of Representatives from 1810 to 1812, serving one year as speaker. He was elected as a Democratic-Republican to the Tenth Congress (March 4, 1807 to March 3, 1809). He was elected as a Democratic-Republican to the U.S. Senate to fill the vacancy caused by the resignation of Jeremiah Mason and served from June 27, 1817, to March 4, 1819; while in the Senate he was chairman of the Committee on the Militia (Fifteenth Congress).

From 1818 to 1824, Storer was high sheriff of Rockingham County. He died in Portsmouth in 1830 and was interred in North Cemetery.

References

External links

 

1760 births
1830 deaths
Members of the New Hampshire House of Representatives
United States senators from New Hampshire
Democratic-Republican Party United States senators
People from Kennebunk, Maine
Democratic-Republican Party members of the United States House of Representatives from New Hampshire